Glanochthon is an extinct genus of temnospondyl amphibian from the Early Permian of Germany. Fossils have been found from the Meisenheim Formation in the Saar–Nahe Basin.

References

Cisuralian temnospondyls of Europe
Fossils of Germany
Stereospondylomorphs
Prehistoric amphibian genera
Fossil taxa described in 2009